Element Pictures is an Irish film studio, cinema and television production company with production and distribution credits in more than 30 films. as well as a number of television series.

History
Element Pictures was founded in 2001 by Ed Guiney and Andrew Lowe.

The company often co-produces with or arranges funding from Irish governmental organizations such as Screen Ireland, as well as from BBC Film and Film4 in the United Kingdom and US companies A24 and Searchlight Pictures.

The company has operated Light House Cinema since January 2012, and the Pálas Cinema in Galway since 2018. Element also owns and operates a distribution company Volta.

In 2015 the company co-produced the television series Red Rock with TV3 as well as the feature film The Lobster.

Also, in 2015, Element Pictures received three Independent Spirit Award nominations and its co-production, Lenny Abrahamson's Room, was nominated for three Golden Globe awards 

In May 2022, a majority stake in Element Pictures was acquired by the European production and distribution company, Fremantle.

Productions

Film 
 Magdalene Sisters (2002)
 Boy Eats Girl (2004)
 Adam and Paul (2004)
 Omagh (2004)
 Lassie (2005)
 The League of Gentlemen's Apocalypse (2005)
 Isolation (2005)
 The Wind That Shakes The Barley (2006)
 Garage (2007)
 Cracks (2009)
 Five Minutes of Heaven (2009)
 Little Matador (2010)
 Parked (2011)
 The Guard (2011)
 What Richard Did (2012)
 Rosie (2018 film)

Co-production 
 Laws of Attraction (2003)
 The Honeymooners (2005)
 All Good Children (2010)
 Essential Killing (2010)
 This Must Be The Place (2011)
 Shadow Dancer (film) (2012)
 Frank (2014)
 Glassland (2014)
 Room (2015)
 The Lobster (2015)
 Disobedience (2017 film)
 The Killing of a Sacred Deer (2017)
 The Favourite (2018)
 Herself (2020)
 The Nest (2020)
 The Souvenir Part II (2021)

Television 
 Prosperity (2007)
 Bittersweet (2008)
 Little White Lie (2008)
 Redwater (2017)
 Normal People (2020)
 Conversations with Friends (2022)
 The Dry (2022)

Co-production 
 Oceans Apart (2005)
 Return to the River (2006)
 Rough Diamond (2006)
 Mist Over Kilrush House (2007)
 The Old Curiosity Shop (2007)
 Murphy's Law (2007)
 The Invisibles (2008)
 Rock Rivals (2008)
 Baker Street Irregulars (2007)
 Inspector George Gently (2009)
 Pure Mule: The Last Weekend (2009)
 A Heart's Desire (2009)
 The Take (2009)
 The Silence (2010)
 Single-Handed (2010)
 This Must Be The Place (2012)
 Moonfleet (2013)
 Dark Touch (2013)
 Red Rock (2015)

References

External links
 Official Site
http://www.scannain.com/irish/element-abrahamson-first-look-deal

Film distributors
Television production companies of Ireland
2022 mergers and acquisitions